Boris Ivanovich Zhuravlyov (July 25, 1946 – February 23, 2019) was a Russian professional football player and coach.

References

External links
 Career summary by KLISF
 Boris Zhuravlyov Interview

1946 births
2019 deaths
Soviet footballers
FC Dynamo Stavropol players
FC Zorya Luhansk players
FC Lokomotiv Moscow players
FC Tobol Kurgan managers
Soviet football managers
Russian football managers
FC Luch Vladivostok managers
Russian expatriate sportspeople in Kazakhstan
FC Dynamo Saint Petersburg managers
Laos national football team managers
Association football midfielders
FC Dynamo Moscow reserves players
Russian expatriate football managers
Russian expatriate sportspeople in Laos
Expatriate football managers in Kazakhstan
Expatriate football managers in Laos